Pamerarma ventralis is a species of dirt-colored seed bug in the family Rhyparochromidae. They are found in Southeast Asia, Australia, and Pacific Islands.

References

External links

 

Rhyparochromidae
Insects described in 1930